Floris IV (24 June 1210 – 19 July 1234) was the count of Holland from 1222 to 1234. He was born in The Hague, a son of William I of Holland and his first wife, Adelaide of Guelders.

Floris succeeded his father in 1222. His regent was Baldwin of Bentheim. He acquired the Land of Altena. He had constant disputes with the bishop of Utrecht, Otto II of Lippe, but helped him against the peasants of Drenthe in 1227. Floris fought in the crusade against the Stedinger north of Bremen in 1234.

On 19 July 1234, he was killed at a tournament in Corbie, France.  He was buried at Rijnsburg Abbey.

Family
Floris married, before 6 December 1224, his stepaunt Matilda, daughter of Duke Henry I of Brabant.

They had the following children:
 William II, Count of Holland (1227–1256), married Elisabeth of Brunswick-Luneburg; parents of Floris V, Count of Holland
 Floris de Voogd (ca. 1228 – 1258), Regent of Holland in 1256–1258.
 Adelaide of Holland (ca. 1230–1284), Regent of Holland in 1258–1263 married John I of Avesnes, Count of Hainaut. 
 Margaret (d. 1277), married Count Herman I of Henneberg-Coburg
 Machteld

External links
Floris IV, graaf van Holland (Dutch)
Medieval Lands Project on Floris IV, Count of Holland

1210 births
1234 deaths
Nobility from The Hague
Counts of Holland
People of the Stedinger Crusade
Accidental deaths in France
Burials at Rijnsburg Abbey
13th-century people of the Holy Roman Empire